The Ragman's Ball is a traditional Irish folk song associated with The Liberties, Dublin, an area in the capital city's inner city. The topic of the song is about a ragman that throws a party, and the various characters that attend the party.

Notable recordings
The Dubliners on their 1964 self titled debut album, and on their 1989 album, The Dubliner's Dublin.

References

Irish folk songs
Irish songs
The Dubliners songs
Year of song unknown
Songwriter unknown